The Krönten is a mountain of the Urner Alps, overlooking the Reuss valley, in the canton of Uri. Its 3,108 metre high summit lies between the valleys of Erstfeld and Gorneren.

References

External links
Krönten on Hikr
Krönten on Summitpost

Mountains of the Alps
Alpine three-thousanders
Mountains of the canton of Uri
Mountains of Switzerland